Crocidomera imitata is a species of snout moth in the genus Crocidomera. It was described by Herbert H. Neunzig in 1990. It is found in Texas and Florida.

Etymology
The name is derived from Latin imita (meaning imitate, copy).

References

Moths described in 1990
Phycitinae